Mattheva is a class of prehistoric mollusc from the late Cambrian, which might be better incorporated in a different class. It was erected to accommodate chiton-like organisms such as Matthevia.
Although questionable, phosphatic fossils have been included in this class, even though molluscs do not use phosphate in their bodies.

See also

 Chiton - Otherwise known as Polyplacophora, a minor mention of Mattheva in section 9

 Matthevia

References

Prehistoric mollusc taxonomy
Prehistoric protostome classes
Enigmatic prehistoric animal genera
Aquatic animals